In telecommunication, an equivalent noise resistance is a quantitative representation in resistance units of the spectral density of a noise-voltage generator, given by

where  is the spectral density,  is the Boltzmann constant,  is the standard noise temperature (290 K), so .

Note:  The equivalent noise resistance in terms of the mean-square noise-generator voltage, e2, within a frequency increment, Δ f, is given by

See also 
 Equivalent input noise
 Effective input noise temperature

Noise (electronics)
Equivalent units